William Allison (1827–1881) was a Republican member of the Wisconsin State Assembly in 1880. He also served as a school board member.

Allison was born on January 1, 1827, in East Kilbride, Scotland In 1851, Allison settled in Vernon, Wisconsin. He later moved to Maxville, Wisconsin, where he would own a farm. He married Mary Crockett from Scotland (1822–1890), with whom he raised seven children. A son, James Allison, would also become a member of the Wisconsin State Assembly. The Allisons were Presbyterian. He died on August 4, 1881, and is interred with his wife in Maxville.

References

1827 births
1881 deaths
19th-century American politicians
19th-century Presbyterians
Republican Party members of the Wisconsin State Assembly
People from Buffalo County, Wisconsin
People from East Kilbride
Scottish emigrants to the United States
Burials in Wisconsin
Politicians from South Lanarkshire